Radar Bros. (also known as Radar Brothers) are an American indie rock band from Los Angeles, California, United States, formed in 1993 by Jim Putnam (vocals, guitar, keyboard), Senon Williams (bass) and Steve Goodfriend (drums). They released their self-titled EP in 1995 on Fingerpaint Records. In 1996, they signed to Restless releasing a self-titled full-length record Radar Bros. the following spring.

Jim Putnam is the son of Bill Putnam, founder of Universal Audio and widely considered to be the father of modern music recording. He founded both Universal Recorders and United Western Recorders.  Jim Putnam was a former guitarist for Medicine and Maids of Gravity before starting the Radar Bros. Putnam has recorded most of the Radar Bros. albums and the Mt. Wilson Repeater release in his studio, the Phase 4 Intergalactic Recording Facility.

Radar Bros. sixth full-length record, The Illustrated Garden, was released in March 2010 on the Merge Records (US), and Chemikal Underground (UK/EU) labels and was the first to include new members Be Hussey and Stevie Treichel, who joined in 2008 to tour the Auditorium album in U.S. and Europe. Original member Senon Williams left the band to play bass in Dengue Fever. An LP version of The Illustrated Garden was released September 2010 on the Squid vs. Whale label.

Radar Bros. have headlined multiple tours across the United States, Canada and Europe, as well as supporting the bands Modest Mouse and Teenage Fanclub on their 2010 U.S. tours. They supported The Breeders on their 2002 European tour and have played with bands such as Low, Cat Power, The Decemberists, Bardo Pond, The Black Heart Procession, and My Morning Jacket. Radar Bros. recorded with John Peel for his "Peel sessions" (December 10, 1996), as well as played at All Tomorrow's Parties at UK 2000 and UK 2006.

The music video for "Brother Rabbit" from the album Auditorium was shot in Healdton, Noble and Norman, Oklahoma in June 2008 and directed by The General Assembly. Putnam's side project Mt. Wilson Repeater released their debut self-titled album in the US in April 2008 on the Eastern Fiction label and in the UK in October 2008 on the Chemikal Underground record label.

The latest full-length record, Eight, was released in the U.S. on January 29, 2013, on Merge Records. The line-up has expanded to include Ethan Walter (keyboards, piano), Brian Cleary (piano, keyboards), and Dan Iead (guitar, pedal steel), who have all toured with the band since 2010. Guitarist Jim Bowers has recently joined the band as a touring member.

Discography

Albums
Radar Bros. (1997, Restless)
The Singing Hatchet (1999, See Thru Broadcasting (US) / Chemikal Underground (UK/EU)))
And The Surrounding Mountains (2002, Merge Records (US) / Chemikal Underground (UK/EU)))
The Fallen Leaf Pages (2005, Merge Records (US) / Chemikal Underground (UK/EU)))
Auditorium (2008, Merge Records (US) / Chemikal Underground (UK/EU))
The Illustrated Garden (2010, Merge Records (US) / Chemikal Underground (UK/EU))
Eight (2013, Merge Records)

EPs and singles
 Radar Bros. – 10″ EP (1995, Fingerpaint Records)
 Radio Edits- EP CD (1996, Restless)
 Stay - EP (1997, Restless)
 Open Ocean Sailing- 7″ (1999, Chemikal Underground)
 Shoveling Sons - 7" (2000, Chemikal Underground)
 Singles + B-Sides CD EP (2000, Self-Released)
 Papillon - Promo Single (2006, Chemikal Underground)

Compilations
 Survive And Advance Vol.1 - “Silver Shoes” (2002, Merge Records)
 Old Enough To Know Better – 15 Years of Merge: “Painted Forest Fire” (2004, Merge Records)
 The Old Lonesome Sound - “Moonshiner” (2009, Splice Today)
 RAM On L.A.- “Uncle Albert/Admiral Halsey” (2009, Aquarium Drunkard)
 SCORE! 20 Years of Merge Records Vol.11 : Kara Walker - "Show Yourself" (2009, Merge Records)
 SCORE! 20 Years of Merge Records Vol.12 : Amy Poehler - "Pomona" (2009, Merge Records)
 Score! 20 Years of Merge Records Vol.12 : Amy Poehler - “We Got The Beat” (2009, Merge Records)
 MERGE Digital Sampler- “Horses Warriors” (2010, Merge Records)

Line-up
Current
Jim Putnam - Lead Vocals, Guitar, Keyboard (founder-present)
Be Hussey - Bass, Background Vocals (2008–present)
Stevie Treichel - Drums (2008–present)
Ethan Walter - Piano, Keyboards (2010–present)
Brian Cleary - Piano, Keyboards (2010–present)
Jim Bowers - Guitars (live) (2012–present)

Former
Dan Iead - Guitar, Pedal Steel (2009–12)
Steve Goodfriend - Drums (founder–2008)
Senon Williams - Bass (founder–2008)
Jeff Palmer - Guitar, Backing Vocals (2005–08)

Touring members
Aaron Burtch - Drums (live)
Eric Morgan - Drums (live) (2008)
Aaron Kyle - Guitar (live) (2008)
Eddie Ruscha - Keyboards (live)
Sean Fallon - Keyboards (live)
Mark Lightcap - Guitar (live)
Brian Thornell - Keyboards (live)
Mark Wooten - Keyboards (live)
Matt Sevareid - Guitar

References

External links

Trouser Press entry

Indie rock musical groups from California
Musical groups from Los Angeles
Merge Records artists
Chemikal Underground artists
Restless Records artists